Alexander Francis George Philip Hollick (13 February 1936 – 6 February 1991), usually known as Philip Hollick, was a cricketer who played for both Ireland and the United States.

A right-handed batsman, Hollick made his debut for Ireland against Sussex in August 1956, scoring one run before being bowled. His second and final match for Ireland was against Scotland in July 1957 scoring a duck in both innings, in what was his only first-class match.

He later played one match for the US national side, against Canada in Montreal in September 1967. He scored one run in the first innings and top-scored in the second with 22 as the USA lost the match by five wickets.

References

1936 births
1991 deaths
American cricketers
Irish cricketers